Nowhere Man is a 2019 Taiwanese streaming television miniseries written, directed, and edited by Chen Yin-jung. It stars Joseph Chang, Alyssa Chia, Mavis Fan, Wang Po-chieh, Jeremiah Zhang, Zhou Ming-fu, Greg Hsu, Kuo Tzu-chien, and Lu Yi-lung. The miniseries follows a death row inmate who must break out of prison to save his kidnapped son and protect his family.

The first Mandarin-language Netflix original series, Nowhere Man premiered in eight parts on October 31, 2019. It received eight Golden Bell Award nominations, including Best Miniseries, and won four.

Synopsis
A strange encounter that causes a man awaiting execution to experience alternate timelines. That leads to his escape from prison to protect his family.

Cast

Main 
 Joseph Chang as Ding Chang-quan
 Alyssa Chia as Jiang Jing-fang
 Mavis Fan as Bai Lan
 Wang Po-chieh as Xiao Sha
 Jeremiah Zhang as Cui Cheng-gui
 Zhou Ming-fu as Cui Wan-fu
 Greg Hsu as Lin Ji-zi / Du Zi-qiang
 Kuo Tzu-chien as Yang Wan-li
 Lu Yi-lung as Xia Shi-ying

Recurring 
 Tou Chung-hua as Wan You-qing
 Benjamin Lee as Wang Qing-nian
 L. C. Sun as Qui Yi-yang
 Shen Hai-yung as Ding Wan-rong / Xia Ding-xiang
 Pan Yi-chun as Zhang Lian-sheng
 Tu Chun-chi as Lin Guan-zhong
 Peng Cian-you as Lin Ben-chuan
 Lucas Hsieh as Jiang Tian-you
 Coco Ho as Wang Xiao-qiu
 Jay Kao as Zhou Xu-liang

English cast 

 Kaiji Tang as Chang Quan
 Vivian Lu as Jing Fang
 Gwendoline Yeo as Bai Lan
 Alan Lee as Xiao Sha
 Greg Chun as Gui
 Khoi Dao as Fu Xing
 Aleks Le as Lin Ji Zi
 Kirk Thornton as Wan Li
 John DeMita as Tang Three Hundred

Episodes

Season 1 (2019)

Awards and nominations

References

External links
 
 

2019 Taiwanese television series debuts
2019 Taiwanese television series endings
2010s crime drama television series
2010s television miniseries
Crime thriller television series
Mandarin-language Netflix original programming
Taiwanese drama television series
Taiwanese thriller television series
Television series about families
Television series about organized crime
Television shows filmed in Taiwan
Child abduction in television
Fiction about prison escapes
Works about friendship